The Plazuela El Recreo is a traditional square located in the Peruvian city of Trujillo in La Libertad Region in northern Peru. Situated at the 8th block of the Pizarro street in the Historic Centre of Trujillo in this square are held cultural shows and in March 2012 was the scenery of Trujillo Book Festival. The square has high ficus around. This square has been declared Monumental Heritage of the Nation by the National Institute of Culture of Peru.

Description

In the center of the square is a marble fountain Italian Baroque style that was in the Plaza de Armas of Trujillo and was moved there in the 1930s, around the fountain there are 4 statues distributed in each frame corner fenced surrounding. There is also the old box that supplied drinking water to the city houses. Several elderly trees give shade to the plaza. In the Plazuela El Recreo are held events like concerts, book festivals, etc. It is visited by people who arrive to Trujillo city. In 2012 was born a project to rebuild the square.

See also

Historic Centre of Trujillo
Chan Chan
Huanchaco
Puerto Chicama
Chimu
Pacasmayo beach
Plaza de Armas of Trujillo
Moche
Víctor Larco Herrera District
Vista Alegre
Buenos Aires
Las Delicias beach
Independence of Trujillo
Wall of Trujillo
Santiago de Huamán
Lake Conache
Marinera Festival
Trujillo Spring Festival
Wetlands of Huanchaco
Association of Breeders and Owners of Paso Horses in La Libertad
Salaverry beach
Puerto Morín
Virú culture
Marcahuamachuco
Wiracochapampa

External links
Location of "Plazuela El Recreo" in Trujillo (Wikimapia)
"Huaca de la luna and Huaca del sol"
"Huacas del Sol y de la Luna Archaeological Complex", Official Website
Information on El Brujo Archaeological Complex
Chan Chan World Heritage Site, UNESCO
Chan Chan conservation project
Website about Trujillo, Reviews, Events, Business Directory
Municipality of Trujillo

Multimedia
 
 
 
 Gallery pictures of Trujillo by Panoramio, Includes Geographical information by various authors
Colonial Trujillo photos

References

Squares in Trujillo, Peru